George River may refer to:

George River (Quebec), Nunavik, Canada
Georges River, Nova Scotia, Canada
George River (Southland), New Zealand
George River (Marlborough), New Zealand
George River (Western Australia)
George River (Alaska), a river of Alaska

See also 
 Georges River
 George Rivers (1553–1630), English politician
 Georges River College (disambiguation)